This is an alphabetical list of the bacterial taxa recorded from South Africa.

A
Family: Actinomycetaceae 

Genus: Actinomyces Harz 1877 
Actinomyces africanus Nannizzi
Actinomyces bovis Harz
Actinomyces chromogenus Gasp
Actinomyces dermatonomus Bull
Actinomyces foulertoni Sartory & Bailly
Actinomyces leishmani Sartory & Bailly
Actinomyces leishmanii Erikson
Actinomyces madurae Lachner-Sandoval
Actinomyces mineaceus Lachner-Sandoval
Actinomyces pijperi Sartory & Bailly
Actinomyces pretorianus Nannizzi
Actinomyces ruber Sartory & Bailly
Actinomyces scabies Güssow
Actinomyces transvalensis Nannizzi
Actinomyces sp.

N
Genus: Nocardia  
Nocardia africana Pijper & Pullinger.
Nocardia foulertoni Chalmers & Christoph. 
Nocardia indica Chalmers & Christopherson.
Nocardia pijperi Castellani & Chaim.
Nocardia pretoriana Pijper & Pullinger.
Nocardia transvalensis Pijper & Pull.
Nocardia sp.

References

Sources

Bacteria
Lists of bacteria